Phyllis M. Grosskurth  (March 16, 1924 – August 2, 2015) was a Canadian academic, writer, and literary critic.

Born in Toronto, Ontario, she received a Bachelor of Arts honours degree in English from the University of Toronto and later a Master of Arts degree from the University of Ottawa. In 1962, she was awarded a doctorate by the University of London, and in addition became a Doctor of Letters at Trinity College, University of Toronto. 

She published ground-breaking studies of literary/ sexual and psycho-analytical subjects: firstly editing the journals and then publishing a biography of John Addington Symonds. This was followed by a controversial exploration of Freud and his inner circle; then a study of Melanie Klein, which was the source of a successful stage play called Mrs Klein written by Nicholas Wright. Her biography of Lord Byron, The Flawed Angel, was the first comprehensive study of the subject for a generation.

Phyllis Grosskurth was in later life professor emerita at the University of Toronto, and in 2000 was made an Officer of the Order of Canada. In 2002, she was awarded the Order of Ontario.

She first married Robert Grosskurth, with whom she had two sons and a daughter. Following their divorce she was married from 1968 to 1978 to Mavor Moore. In her later years she was married to Robert McMullan.

She died on August 2, 2015 in Toronto.

Selected bibliography
 Byron: The Flawed Angel (1997)
 The Secret Ring: Freud's Inner Circle and the Politics of Psychoanalysis (1991)
 Melanie Klein: Her World and Her Work (1986), winner of the 1986 Governor General's Awards
 Havelock Ellis: A Biography (1980)
 John Addington Symonds: A Biography (1964), winner of the 1964 Governor General's Awards

References
 
 

1924 births
2015 deaths
Alumni of the University of London
Canadian biographers
Canadian Anglicans
Governor General's Award-winning non-fiction writers
Members of the Order of Ontario
Officers of the Order of Canada
Writers from Toronto
University of Ottawa alumni
University of Toronto alumni
Trinity College (Canada) alumni
Academic staff of the University of Toronto
Canadian women non-fiction writers
Women biographers